Westcombe Park RFC is a rugby football club based in Orpington in south-east London. The name of the club comes from the Westcombe Park area of what is today part of the Royal Borough of Greenwich, where the club was founded. The club played on fields in Lee, Shooter's Hill and Sidcup before the move to Orpington. Westcombe Park play in London & South East Premier, a level five league in the English rugby union system following their promotion from London 1 South at the end of the 2019–20 season.

History
The club – also known as 'Combe' – was founded by rugby fanatic Dudley E Roughton, a disabled man unable to play the game himself, making the club unique in that its founder was not an original player. In the summer of 1904 he decided to form his own team. Founding members included siblings, friends and extended family. The Church aided the formation of the club in the shape of the Rev W T Money, who played until the age of 52. Several pictures from this time are on display on the club website. The club's early results were encouraging and sometimes two or more sides turned out. Before the Great War the club shifted its headquarters several times and eventually lighted upon Harrow Field Farm, Lee.

With the outbreak of World War I in 1914, club rugby was put on hold for four years. The war took its toll on the team with 23 of the club's 84 members being killed on duty. Amongst them was Cecil Harold Sewell – posthumously awarded the Victoria Cross in 1918. The club reconvened in 1919 and resumed playing at Sidcup RFC's ground. By 1925–6 Combe was running six sides and was fully involved in the Kent Cup.

In 1930, the club started to look for its own ground. The club had by then transferred to Shooters Hill and was using converted stables as a club-house, complete with baths and electricity. When the Shooters Hill ground was acquired for housing, the search for a permanent home became even more pressing. A club member negotiated with Orpington Council for the lease of two pitches (later increased to four) and a plot of adjoining land was purchased to enable the erection of a pavilion. At this time the pavilion was one of a handful of properties in what became Craven Road.

Club rugby was further interrupted by World War II, after which the club reformed and two teams ran out during the 1945–46 season (Combe was also able to repay Sidcup for their hospitality earlier). Players more local to Orpington now joined the club. Membership and the number of playing sides increased.

By the mid-1960s the original club house had been replaced with a wooden structure, housing baths, changing rooms with re-mountable partitions, and warm-air heating. The club remained in the Craven Road site until 1990.

Today
Most youth rugby occurs on Sundays (occasional National Cup Academy matches take place on Saturdays). The club fields at least one team per age group between the ages of 7 and 19 with a strong reputation amongst other clubs, including London Irish, Colchester RFC and Blackheath. The club boasts international representatives at several levels including ex-England Universities captain John Moyce. The 1st XV plays its rugby in London South East Premier, with up to five senior teams playing at weekends including the 1st team and a 2nd XV commonly known as the X-Men who play in The Kent Invicta League. "Combe" aims to be a club to suit all, from its Minis (age 7) through to its 1st team (and four other senior sides), catering for all standards of rugby.

Relocation to the present site at Goddington Dene, Orpington took place in 1990 when the club became the major section within the Orpington Sports Club. In 1994, Westcombe Park took over the running and responsibility for the sports club and offered playing facilities, issuing contractual terms, to other sports (cricket, football, tennis and table tennis) as Associated Clubs under the control of Westcombe Park and Orpington Sports Club. In 1995, the club became a limited company, registered under the Industrial and Provident Societies Act 1965. The club now has four rugby pitches, a grandstand, a fully equipped gymnasium, two football pitches, two cricket squares and three tennis courts.

Honours
 London 3 South East champions: 1989–90
 Kent Cup winners (8): 1993, 1995, 1998, 1999, 2000, 2002, 2004, 2016
 London Division 1 champions: 1998–99
 National Division Three (north v south) promotion play-off winners: 2006–07
 Kent Plate winners (2): 2014, 2018
 Kent Vets Plate winners (1): 2017
 Kent Vets Cup winners (2): 2019, 2020

References

External links
 Official website

English rugby union teams
Orpington
Rugby clubs established in 1904
Rugby union clubs in London
1904 establishments in England